The National Association of Mutual Insurance Companies (NAMIC) is the only U.S. trade association representing mutual property/casualty insurance companies.  Founded in 1895, NAMIC has been serving its U.S. and Canadian members in areas of advocacy and education.

NAMIC is the largest and most diverse property/casualty trade association in the country, with 1,400 regional and local mutual insurance member companies serving more than 135 million auto, home, and business policyholders and writing in excess of $196 billion in annual premiums.  NAMIC member companies account for 50 percent of the automobile/homeowners market share and 31 percent of the business insurance market share.  More than 200,000 people are employed by NAMIC member companies.

The association was incorporated in 1920 in Indianapolis, Indiana, where its national headquarters is still located.  It also has a Washington, D.C. office located on Capitol Hill.  In addition to its advocacy work at the federal level of government, NAMIC also has a network of state managers to represent member companies in every statehouse in the country. NAMIC also provides services that assist member companies, state-based trade associations, and the industry at large through educational programs while increasing public awareness and understanding of the principles of insurance and the many contributions the property/casualty insurance industry makes to society.

References

External links
NAMIC – National Association of Mutual Insurance Companies (NAMIC)

Financial services companies established in 1895
Insurance companies of the United States